Marco Antonio Vilca Gonzales (born 2 December 2000) is a Peruvian middle-distance runner specialising in the 800 metres. He has won several medals at continental level.

His twin sister Sheyla Vilca is also a runner.

International competitions

Personal bests
Outdoor
400 metres – 46.95 (Trujillo 2019)
800 metres – 1:47.65 (Lima 2019)

References

2000 births
Living people
Peruvian male middle-distance runners
Pan American Games competitors for Peru
Athletes (track and field) at the 2019 Pan American Games
People from Arequipa
Twin sportspeople
Peruvian twins
21st-century Peruvian people